Melvindale–Northern Allen Park Public Schools is a school district in Wayne County, Michigan, headquartered in Melvindale. It serves Melvindale and northern Allen Park.

Schools
 Melvindale High School #2 (Melvindale)
 Strong Middle School (Melvindale)
 Allendale Elementary School (Melvindale)
 Rogers Early Elementary School (Allen Park)

Defunct schools
Dasher Elementary School (Melvindale) - This school has been razed.
Evans Elementary School (Melvindale, formerly Robert Elementary School) - This school has been razed.
Kaier Elementary School (Melvindale) - This school has been razed.
Mead Elementary School (Allen Park) 
Palmer Elementary School (Melvindale) - This school has been razed.
Quandt Elementary School (Allen Park, formerly Melvindale High School #1) - This school at 14800 University Street has been razed.
Robert Elementary School (Melvindale) - This school has been razed.

References

External links

 Melvindale-Northern Allen Park Public Schools

School districts in Michigan
Education in Wayne County, Michigan